A venture client is a company that purchases and uses the product of a startup with the purpose to obtain a strategic benefit. The difference between a “normal” client and a venture client is that the startup product presents a high risk of failing. The venture client company accepts the additional risk because the startup product solves a strategically relevant problem better than alternative solutions. The problem is strategic when it impacts the competitiveness of the venture client company. The term venture client was coined originally and popularized by Gregor Gimmy.

Some companies that can benefit strategically from many startups chose to establish a dedicated corporate venture client unit. The purpose of such an organisational unit is to enable the entire company to gain competitive advantage from startups on a continuous basis. Such venture client units are categorised as a corporate venturing vehicle. 

Notable companies using the venture client approach through a dedicated venture client unit are BMW Group (BMW Startup Garage), BSH Hausgeräte (BSH Startup Kitchen), Holcim (Holcim MAQER) and Bosch Group (Open Bosch).

References 

Startup accelerators
Business models